Nikos Sampanidis (born 2 November 1998) is a Greek professional footballer who plays as a striker for Super League 2 club Apollon Pontus.

References

1998 births
Living people
Greek footballers
Greece youth international footballers
Super League Greece players
Football League (Greece) players
Super League Greece 2 players
Xanthi F.C. players
Doxa Drama F.C. players
Egaleo F.C. players
Kavala F.C. players
Apollon Pontou FC players
Association football forwards
Footballers from Xanthi